Her's were an indie rock band from Liverpool, England, composed of Stephen Fitzpatrick and Audun Laading. The band's debut full-length LP Invitation to Her's was released in August 2018, following the compilation LP Songs of Her's which had been released in May 2017. 

The duo were killed in the early hours of 27 March 2019 in a road traffic collision in Arizona, while on tour in the United States.

Members 

The band's line-up consisted of Stephen Fitzpatrick, from Barrow-in-Furness, Cumbria, England, who sang lead vocals and played guitar, and Audun Laading, from Flekkerøy, Kristiansand, Norway, who played bass guitar and sang backing vocals. Fitzpatrick was also a drummer, but the band used a drum machine with both members contributing to its programming.

Career
Fitzpatrick and Laading met at the Liverpool Institute for Performing Arts, (from which they both graduated in 2016 after three-year music degrees, being presented with their certificates by Paul McCartney at a graduation ceremony). Whilst still students they formed Her's in 2015, after having previously played together in the rhythm section of another Liverpool band named 'The Sundogs'. The duo initially formed Her's in jest, travelling around Liverpool filming comedic music videos and posting them on YouTube.

They released their debut single, "Dorothy", on 7 April 2016. They performed on the 2016 Green Man Festival Rising Stage. A nine-track compilation titled Songs of Her's was released on 12 May 2017. The compilation received four stars from The Skinny. Writing for NME in April 2017, Thomas Smith said:

The band later released their debut full-length album, Invitation to Her's, on Heist or Hit Records on 24 August 2018. Her's were featured on Pastes list titled "The 15 New Liverpool Bands You Need to Know in 2018". An acoustic performance by the band at the 2019 South by Southwest festival in Austin, Texas, US was also featured on BBC Music Introducing.

Deaths
On 27 March 2019, around 1 a.m., Fitzpatrick (age 24) and Laading (25) along with their tour manager, Trevor Engelbrektson (37) from Minneapolis, were killed in a head-on traffic collision and subsequent vehicle fire near Milepost 68 on Interstate 10, west of Tonopah, Arizona. The Arizona Department of Public Safety confirmed that Engelbrektson had been driving the band's Ford tour van at the time of the crash. The driver of a Nissan pick-up truck, Francisco Rebollar, aged 64, from Murrieta, California, was also killed in the collision; a subsequent police investigation of the scene located a bottle of alcohol in the wreckage. At the time of the crash, the Arizona Department of Public Safety was already responding to reports of the Nissan pick-up truck travelling at speed in the wrong direction going eastbound on the westbound carriageway.

A requiem mass for Fitzpatrick was held at St. Mary's (Roman Catholic) Church, Barrow-in-Furness, on 23 April 2019, followed by a burial at Barrow-in-Furness cemetery.

Discography

Albums

Studio albums

Compilation albums

Singles

Music videos

References

External links 

2015 establishments in England
2019 deaths
2019 disestablishments in England
Dream pop musical groups
English alternative rock groups
English indie rock groups
English musical duos
Male musical duos
Musical groups disestablished in 2019
Musical groups established in 2015
Musical groups from Liverpool
Road incident deaths in Arizona
Rock music duos